The first Government of Prime Minister Fatos Nano was an emergency government that served as the 50th Government of Albania. The country's reformation as the Republic of Albania in the middle of this cabinet, on 29 April 1991, made this the final cabinet of the People's Socialist Republic of Albania.

History
On 21 February 1991, Ramiz Alia, Chairman of the Presidium of the Albanian People's Assembly and First Secretary of the Party of Labor of Albania, assumed personal control over the government of Albania and announced that he would replace Adil Çarçani and his 23-member cabinet. Alia promptly appointed Deputy Prime Minister Fatos Nano to lead this new government, who was considered a reformist economist.  Shkëlqim Cani, who served as Deputy Prime Minister alongside Nano, was kept in his position. All other cabinet members were newly appointed.

On 29 April 1991, the People's Socialist Republic was reformed as the Republic of Albania. On 30 April 1991, Ramiz Alia officially began his term as Albania's first president since 1928.

The majority of the cabinet resigned on 10 May 1991 and a new cabinet was announced. Aside from Nano, only two ministers were retained. The primary motivation for the change of cabinet was an attempt by the People's Assembly to bolster morale.

Cabinet

See also
 Council of Ministers (Albania)

Notes

References

G50
1991 establishments in Albania
Ministries established in 1991